2 Future 4 U is the third studio album by American record producer Armand Van Helden. It was released on November 30, 1998, by Tinted and includes the singles "U Don't Know Me" and "Flowerz".

Track listing

Charts

Release history

References

1998 albums
Armand Van Helden albums
London Records albums